Breslau is the pre-1945 German name of Wrocław, Poland.

Breslau may also refer to:
 Breslau, Ontario, Canada
 Breslau, Nebraska, U.S.
 Lindenhurst, New York or Breslau, New York, U.S.
 Breslau, Texas, U.S.
 SMS Breslau, a ship of the German Kaiserliche Marine
 , a German exonym for Braslava, Latvia

People with the surname
 Bernard Bresslaw (1934–1993), British actor
 Ernst Bresslau (1877–1935), German zoologist
 Gertrude Breslau Hunt (1869–1952), American author and lecturer
 Louise Breslau (1856–1927), German/Swiss artist
 Marcus Hyman Bresslau (1807/8–1864), British newspaper editor
 Mendel Breslau (1760–1829), Silesian writer

See also
 Battle of Breslau (disambiguation)
 Braslav (disambiguation)

German-language surnames
Jewish surnames
Surnames of Silesian origin